The 1933 Denver Pioneers football team was an American football team that represented the University of Denver as a member of the Rocky Mountain Conference (RMC) during the 1933 college football season. In their second season under head coach Percy Locey, the Pioneers compiled a 5–3–1 record (5–1–1 against conference opponents), shared the RMC title with Colorado Agricultural and Utah, and outscored opponents by a total of 107 to 46.

Schedule

References

Denver
Denver Pioneers football seasons
Rocky Mountain Athletic Conference football champion seasons
Denver Pioneers football